Estadio Metropolitano (formerly Estadio Olímpico) is a station on Line 7 of the Madrid Metro. It is located in fare Zone A. Passengers going eastbound to stations beyond this station will have to change trains from line 7A to 7B using the island platform, the same situation happens for those coming from the towns of Coslada and San Fernando.

History 
The station opened on 5 May 2007 as part of the extension to the towns of Coslada and San Fernando, it was built to serve the nearby La Peineta Stadium. It was renamed from Estadio Olímpico to Estadio Metropolitano in June 2017, coinciding with the opening of the new Metropolitano Stadium.

Gallery

References 

Line 7 (Madrid Metro) stations
Railway stations in Spain opened in 2007
Buildings and structures in San Blas-Canillejas District, Madrid